Suicide Squad: Kill the Justice League is an upcoming online action-adventure game developed by Rocksteady Studios and published by Warner Bros. Games. It is the fifth main installment in the Batman: Arkham series, taking place five years after the events of Batman: Arkham Knight, and the first not to feature Batman as the main protagonist, though the character still appears, posthumously voiced by Kevin Conroy in his final performance as Batman. Based on the DC Comics supervillain/anti-hero team the Suicide Squad, the game revolves around the titular team of super-criminals, who are assembled by Amanda Waller and sent to Metropolis to stop the alien invader Brainiac and save the members of the Justice League who have been brainwashed by him.

The game is scheduled released on May 26, 2023 for the PlayStation 5, Windows, and Xbox Series X/S.

Gameplay 
Suicide Squad: Kill the Justice League is a genre-bending action-adventure game set in an open world based in Metropolis. The game features four playable characters: Captain Boomerang, Deadshot, Harley Quinn, and King Shark. While it can be played solo, the game also features a four-player cooperative multiplayer mode. When played solo, players can switch between characters at will, while the other characters are controlled by the AI.

Premise 
The game is set in the universe previously established by the Batman: Arkham series, taking place five years after the events of Batman: Arkham Knight. Amanda Waller (Debra Wilson) creates a task force known as the Suicide Squad, which is composed of Arkham Asylum inmates Harley Quinn (Tara Strong), Captain Boomerang (Daniel Lapaine), Deadshot (Bumper Robinson) and King Shark (Samoa Joe), for a covert mission in Metropolis. Only when they arrive in the city do they realize the severity of the situation: Brainiac has invaded Earth and has started brainwashing its inhabitants, including Justice League members Superman, The Flash (Scott Porter), Green Lantern, and Batman (Kevin Conroy), with Wonder Woman as the only apparent member who is not under Brainiac's control.  It is up to the Suicide Squad, with reluctant aid from Wonder Woman, to save the world by freeing the Justice League from Brainiac's control and stopping Brainiac himself before he takes over Metropolis and, eventually, the world.

Development 

A video game based on the Suicide Squad was first announced by then DC Comics chief creative officer Geoff Johns in July 2010. In February 2012, he elaborated that the game was in development, adding that "Because of the concept, you have a game where any of the lead characters can conceivably die and it's not a stunt. Some really cool story could come out of that." The formation of the Suicide Squad was teased at the end of Batman: Arkham Origins in 2013 – developed by WB Games Montreal – which featured a post-credits scene in which Deathstroke is asked by Amanda Waller to join the team, and in Batman: Arkham Origins Blackgate, in which Deadshot and Bronze Tiger join the team with Bane under consideration. In the years since Batman: Arkham Knight was released, there have been rumours suggesting that WB Games Montreal was working on a Suicide Squad game, but no official announcement was made from the development team or publisher. In December 2016, Jason Schreier from Kotaku revealed that the title was cancelled.

Rocksteady Studios announced Suicide Squad: Kill the Justice League in August 2020. Rocksteady, the creator of the Batman: Arkham franchise, was initially rumored to be working on a Superman-themed game, which they later debunked. The first trailer for the game premiered at DC FanDome on August 22, 2020. As the game is set in the "Arkhamverse", plot threads established in the Batman: Arkham series, including the Joker's death in Batman: Arkham City and the public revelation of Batman's identity as Bruce Wayne in Batman: Arkham Knight, would continue in Suicide Squad: Kill the Justice League. The Los Angeles-based company Unbroken Studios are assisting Rocksteady in the developing of the game.

Prequel comic 
A prequel comic titled Suicide Squad: Kill Arkham Asylum is set to be released on May 30, 2023, four days after the game's release. Its story will take place between the events of Batman: Arkham Knight and Suicide Squad: Kill The Justice League, and will be about how Amanda Waller took control of Arkham Asylum and recruited Task Force X for their mission to save the Justice League.

Release 
On March 23, 2022, Rocksteady announced that the title had been delayed from its initial 2022 launch window to early 2023. At The Game Awards 2022, the release date was revealed to be May 26, along with the announcement that Batman would appear in the game, voiced by Kevin Conroy in his final performance as the character due to his death in November 2022.

On February 23, 2023, during a PlayStation State of Play and a separate FAQ, Rocksteady confirmed the game would require an internet connection at all times (even when playing solo), have a battle pass (only including cosmetics), and is set to receive post-launch content, such as new playable characters, new additional missions and new weapons.

References

External links 
 

Action-adventure games
Alien invasions in video games
Batman: Arkham
Fiction about mind control
Multiplayer and single-player video games
Open-world video games
PlayStation 5 games
Rocksteady Studios games
Science fiction video games
Suicide Squad
Superhero video games
Unreal Engine games
Upcoming video games scheduled for 2023
Video games based on DC Comics
Video games based on Justice League
Video games developed in the United Kingdom
Video games directed by Sefton Hill
Video games featuring female protagonists
Video games set in the United States
Warner Bros. video games
Windows games
Xbox Series X and Series S games
Video games postponed due to the COVID-19 pandemic